The 2014 Taça de Angola was the 33rd edition of the Taça de Angola, the second most important and the top knock-out football club competition in Angola, following the Girabola. Benfica de Luanda beat defending champions Petro de Luanda 1–0 in the final to secure its first title.

The winner and the runner-up qualified to the 2015 CAF Confederation Cup.

Stadiums and locations

Championship bracket

Preliminary rounds

Round of 16

Quarter-finals

Semi-finals

Final

See also
 2014 Girabola
 2015 Angola Super Cup
 2015 CAF Confederation Cup
 Benfica de Luanda players
 Petro de Luanda players

External links
 Tournament profile at girabola.com
 Tournament profile at rsssf.com

References

Angola Cup
Taca de Angola
Taca de Angola